Zenobia of Armenia (fl. 1st century) was a royal Iberian princess of the Pharnavazid dynasty who was a Queen of Armenia from 51 to 53 and 54 to 55 during the reign of her husband, King Rhadamistus.

Life
Zenobia was a daughter of King Mithridates of Armenia by his wife, a daughter of King Pharasmanes I of Iberia, who was Mithridates' own brother. At the same time, she was a wife of Rhadamistus who was Pharasmanes' son.

Zenobia's father Mithridates reigned in Armenia until her husband and Mithridates' nephew and son-in-law Rhadamistus usurped the Armenian throne by the sudden invasion. Her husband destroyed her entire family. Rhadamistus killed both of Zenobia's parents, her mother being Rhadamistus' own sister. Zenobia's brothers were also killed by Rhadamistus just because they were crying over their parents' death.

After execution of her entire family Rhadamistus became king in 51 and she became his queen. Armenians revolted soon after and, with the Parthian support of prince Tiridates I, forced both to flee back to Iberia.

According to Tacitus:

Zenobia is said to have given birth to an unknown son from Rhadamistus in Armenia. Her and her child's later life is unknown. Her husband returning home to Iberia was soon, in 58, put to death as traitor by his own father Pharasmanes. According to the historian Leo, Zenobia lived in Tiridates’ court until her death.

In art

Paintings
"Zenobia accudita dai pastori sulle rive dell'Aras" by Bartolomeo Cittadella. 
"Rhadamistus killing Zenobia" by Luigi Sabatelli (1803).
"Zenobia found on the banks of the Araxes" by Paul-Jacques-Aimé Baudry. (won Prix de Rome in 1850).
"Zenobia found by Sheperds on the banks of the Araxes" by William-Adolphe Bouguereau. (won Prix de Rome in 1850).
"Queen Zenobia found on the Banks of the Arax" by Nicolas Poussin.
"Rhadamistes and Zenobia" by Jean-Joseph Taillasson.
"Queen Zenobia taken from river Araxes by shepherds" by Francesco Nenci.
"Radamisto in atto di spingere Zenobia ferita nel fiume Arasse" by Francesco Alberi.
"Zénobie trouvée mourante sur les bords de l’Araxe" by Merry-Joseph Blondel.
"Zénobie découverte par les bergers sur les bords de l'Araxe" by Charles Camille Chazal.
"Zénobie trouvée mourante par les bergers sur les bords de l'Araxe" by Pierre Dupuis.
"Zenobia" by Émile Lévy.
"Zenobia Discovered by Shepherds on the Banks of the Araxes" by Félix-Henri Giacomotti.
"Queen Zenobia Thrown Into the Araxes River" by François Chifflart.
"Rhadamiste poignarde sa femme Zénobie" by Etienne Meslier.
"The finding of Zenobia by the shepherds" by Jean-Auguste-Dominique Ingres.

Statues

"Le corps de Zénobie, reine d'Arménie retiré de l'Araxe" by Jean Esprit Marcellin at Palace of Fontainebleau.

Operas
"L’Amour tyrannique" by Georges de Scudéry
"Zenobia e Radamisto" by Giovanni Legrenzi
"Rhadamiste et Zénobie" by Prosper Jolyot de Crébillon
"La Zenobia" by Matteo Noris
"Zenobia" by Metastasio
"L'amor tirannico, o Zenobia" by Domenico Lalli
"Zenobia" by Giovanni Bononcini
"Zenobia" by Johann Adolph Hasse
"Zenobia" by Gaetano Latilla
"La Zenobia" by Davide Perez
"Zenobia" by Niccolò Piccinni
"Zenobia" by Gioacchino Cocchi
"Zenobia" by Giovanni Battista Pescetti
"Zenobia" by Tommaso Traetta
"La Zenobia" by Nicola Sala
"Zenobia" by Luca Antonio Predieri
"Zenobia" by Francesco Uttini
"Zenobia" by Antonio Tozzi
"Zenobia" by Francesco Bianchi
"Zenobia" by Louis Coerne
"La Zenobia" by Joseph Friebert
"L'amor tirannico, ossia Zenobia" by Francesco Feo
"Zenobia" by Ambrogio Minoja
"Zenobia" by Giovanni Buonaventura Viviani
Zenobia was played by Adrienne Lecouvreur, Caterina Gabrielli and Anastasia Robinson

Plays
Unfinished play "Rodamist i Zenobiya" by Alexander Griboyedov

Gallery

References

Sources

Tacitus, Annals, Book XII-XIII

Toumanoff, Cyril (1969), Chronology of the early Kings of Iberia, Vol. 25
Javakhishvili, Ivane (2012), History of the Georgian Nation, Vol. 1

Armenian queens consort
Ancient queens consort
1st-century deaths
Pharnavazid dynasty